Cleveland Lorenzo Brown Jr., or simply Junior, is a fictional character in the animated television series Family Guy and its spin-off series The Cleveland Show. He is the son of Cleveland Brown and his late ex-wife Loretta. On Family Guy, he was depicted as slim and hyperactive; however, on The Cleveland Show, he was shown to have undergone a marked transformation, both in terms of a significant increase in weight and a newly subdued personality, with the new full name of Cleveland Raj Rerun Dwayne Brown Jr. — in "A Rodent Like This", the redesigned Junior is revealed to be a CIA imposter known as Agent 14, who kidnapped and replaced the original Junior as part of a plan to kill Tim the Terrorist. He was voiced by Mike Henry in Family Guy and by Kevin Michael Richardson in The Cleveland Show and the character's return to the former show.

At 14 years old, Junior is the only child of Cleveland, the stepson of Donna Tubbs, and the stepbrother of Roberta and Rallo Tubbs. Upon his parents' divorce, Loretta gave custody of Cleveland Jr. to Cleveland and forced him to move. The two left for California. However, en route, they decided to live in Stoolbend, Virginia, instead, where Cleveland married Donna Tubbs, and Rallo and Roberta became his step-siblings. Junior's most prominent character traits are his laziness, obesity, and low social intelligence (although there are occasional references to him being academically bright).

Role in The Cleveland Show
Cleveland Jr. is a frequent target of weight-related jokes from a variety of characters in the series, in particular his step-brother Rallo. When Rallo met Cleveland Jr. and his father, he would often call them "fat". In the second episode, Cleveland Jr. served as a door in the bathroom so that he could earn his classmates' respect, which angered Cleveland. He also exudes a nervous and overly sensitive nature.

While Junior is not as active as he was in Family Guy, he has other hobbies and interests; he enjoys science, playing the tuba in the Stoolbend High School school band, and is the leader of a troop of Freedom Scouts, Stoolbend's version of the Boy Scouts. 

Cleveland Brown Jr. is married to Cecilia, as shown in "Y Tu Junior También", to prevent her deportation.

Character

Creation
Cleveland Jr. debuted in the Family Guy season 2 episode "Love Thy Trophy", but only made a handful more appearances thereafter. He was presumably taken into Loretta's custody after she divorced Cleveland in "The Cleveland–Loretta Quagmire" and has since undergone a major character reinvention upon becoming a leading character in The Cleveland Show. After Cleveland and Loretta's divorce is finalized in the pilot episode of The Cleveland Show, a now-overweight Junior is placed in Cleveland's custody, and they move out of Quahog, Rhode Island to Stoolbend, Virginia where Cleveland rekindles a relationship with, and subsequently marries, his high school sweetheart, Donna Tubbs.

Design

In Family Guy Cleveland Jr. is an active child of average size, but in The Cleveland Show he has aged, gained weight, appears potentially smarter, and wears glasses. In Family Guy, he wears a purple T-shirt, blue jeans and white sneakers, but in The Cleveland Show, he wears a red T-shirt, blue shorts, sneakers and glasses. He is also notably shorter, as Family Guy shows him to be of average height for his age, while in The Cleveland Show, he appears to be no more than 5 ft. at the age of 14.

Cleveland Jr. was a minor character who had a short time with Peter Griffin in the episode, "Fore Father", where he showed a talent for playing golf. After that episode, he made short appearances later in the show, with his last on Family Guy, until 2010 at his father's supposed funeral, along with Loretta.

Voice

Junior's voice is provided by Kevin Michael Richardson, who voices other characters on The Cleveland Show, including Lester Krinklesac, Julius, and P-Hound. In Family Guy, Junior's voice is provided by Mike Henry.

Richardson stated that he describes voicing Cleveland Jr. as "a character he did on ER named Patrick, who was mentally impaired and wore a football helmet." Before the show aired in 2009, the show's panel appeared at the 2009 Comic Con International, and held a discussion about the show. When describing Junior's change in physical appearance and age, Mike Henry said "Cleveland Jr. really didn't have much to him and so he didn't appear for a while and so we sort of aged him up and made room for Rallo to be the younger one for a while." The show's creators later gave an explanation of Junior's altered look in "A Rodent Like This".

References

External links
Official The Cleveland Show website on FOX.com

Family Guy characters
The Cleveland Show characters
Black characters in animation
Fictional African-American people
Child characters in animated television series
Fictional characters from Rhode Island
Television characters introduced in 2000
Animated human characters
Atheism in television
Teenage characters in television
Male characters in animated series
Characters created by Seth MacFarlane